Radiodread is a 2006 tribute album by the Easy Star All-Stars that covers Radiohead's 1997 album OK Computer in reggae, ska and dub styles.

History 
Radiodread producer and arranger Michael Goldwasser said:
OK Computer has elements that are perfect [for reggae] – strong melodies, intense dynamics and trippy soundscapes. On the other hand, it has complex time signatures, lots of chord changes and things that typically aren't found in reggae. However, the more we looked at it, the more we realized that this was an album we had to do.

Radiohead singer Thom Yorke praised it and guitarist Jonny Greenwood described it as "truly astounding".

The track listing is identical to OK Computer'''s, and no songs were changed by the Easy Star All-Stars, except for "Fitter Happier" (which has slightly altered lyrics to fit the style, with permission from Radiohead), and "Paranoid Android".  The new lyrics are essentially the same, but phrased differently, including some Jamaican patois.  For example, "God loves his children" becomes "Jah loves his children".

Track listing
"Airbag" (featuring Horace Andy) – 5:00
"Paranoid Android" (featuring Kirsty Rock) – 6:27
"Subterranean Homesick Alien" (featuring Junior Jazz) – 4:41
"Exit Music (For a Film)" (featuring Sugar Minott) – 4:23
"Let Down" (featuring Toots & the Maytals) – 4:44
"Karma Police" (featuring Citizen Cope) – 4:48
"Fitter Happier" (featuring Menny More) – 2:20
"Electioneering" (featuring Morgan Heritage) – 4:34
"Climbing Up the Walls" (featuring Tamar-kali) – 4:56
"No Surprises" (featuring The Meditations) – 4:02
"Lucky" (featuring Frankie Paul) – 5:45
"The Tourist" (featuring Israel Vibration) – 4:07
"Exit Music (For a Dub)" – 4:39
"An Airbag Saved My Dub" – 4:50
"Dub Is What You Get" (Mad Professor/Joe Ariwa Mix) (Vinyl Only) – 4:38
"Lucky Dub A" (Mad Professor/Joe Ariwa Mix) (Vinyl Only) – 4:53
 "High and Dry" (featuring Morgan Heritage) (track #15 on the Special Edition release) – 5:10

See alsoExit Music: Songs with Radio HeadsReferences

External links

"Radiodread: Music of Human Origin", The Peer'', 6 October 2006

2006 albums
Easy Star All-Stars albums
Radiohead tribute albums
Easy Star Records albums
Albums produced by Michael Goldwasser